Nepeta curviflora, commonly known as Syrian catnip, is a herbaceous flowering plant native to the Middle East. It was first described in 1844.

Description
Nepeta curviflora is a perennial chamaephyte reaching heights between 60 and 80 cm. The fine, silvery aromatic leaves are small and form in clumps. The leaves are dentate. It will flower between April and June. The flowers are tubular and dark blue, appearing as verticillasters grouped on spikes. The fruit appears as nutlets.

Distribution
Nepeta curviflora is native to the far eastern coastal regions of the Mediterranean, namely Israel, Palestine, Lebanon and Syria. It inhabits Phrygana and Mediterranean woodlands, notably within the montane regions of Mount Hermon.

Uses
Nepeta curviflora is occasionally seen in Horticulture, where it is sometimes mistaken with the similar appearing Nepeta italica. The two are differentiated by their flower colors, with N. italica presenting white while N. curviflora appears blue.

References

curviflora
Plants described in 1844